Eaton is a civil parish in Cheshire East, England.  It contains six buildings that are recorded in the National Heritage List for England as designated listed buildings, all of which are at Grade II.  This grade is the lowest of the three gradings given to listed buildings and is applied to "buildings of national importance and special interest".  Apart from the village of Eaton, the parish is mainly rural, the exceptions being a large sand excavation on the site of the former Eaton Hall, and a former industrial settlement named Havannah.  There are two listed structures associated with Havannah, a bridge and a weir.  The other listed buildings are a church, a public house, a house, and a farmhouse.

See also
Listed buildings in Congleton
Listed buildings in Marton
Listed buildings in North Rode
Listed buildings in Hulme Walfield

References
Citations

Sources

Listed buildings in the Borough of Cheshire East
Lists of listed buildings in Cheshire